Loch nan Eun is a remote freshwater loch, located in Gleann Taitneach in the Grampian Mountains, Perth and Kinross, some 4.5 miles west of The Cairnwell, Scotland.

References

Eun
Eun
Tay catchment